Inteligencia de la Gendarmería Nacional Argentina (Argentine National Gendarmerie Intelligence) is the intelligence service of the Argentine National Gendarmerie, commonly referred as SIGN (Servicio de Inteligencia de la Gendarmería Nacional, National Gendarmerie Intelligence Service) inside of the Intelligence Secretariat.

See also
Argentine Federal Police
Argentine National Gendarmerie
Interior Security System
National Intelligence System
National Directorate of Criminal Intelligence

Federal law enforcement agencies of Argentina
Argentine intelligence agencies